There are two rivers in Idaho named "Lost", the Big Lost River and the Little Lost River. They are often considered separate streams, but both flow into the same depression and become subterranean, feeding the Snake River Aquifer. The rivers are located in Custer County and Butte County, in Idaho in the United States. Via the aquifer and numerous springs, they are tributaries of the Snake River.

Course
The river originates in the Pioneer Mountains in Salmon-Challis National Forest, flows northeast then turns southeast, with the Lost River Range to the east separating the Big Lost River Valley from the Little Lost River Valley. A dam impounds the river and creates Mackay Reservoir. Near Arco the river enters the Snake River Plain, curves east and then northeast and enters the depression where the water flows into the ground, called Big Lost River Sinks. Near the sinks there is a dry distributary called the Dry Channel Big Lost River.

It flows southeast between the Lost River Range to the west and the Lemhi Range to the east. It enters the Snake River Plain north of the sinks and flows into them at locations called Little Lost River Sinks.

The sinks and the lower courses of both rivers are within the land of the Idaho National Laboratory, northeast of Craters of the Moon. Due to irrigation using the aquifer's water, most of the rivers' water is pumped out of the ground, used to irrigate crops, and returned to the ground as irrigation drainage, where it eventually emerges at the springs and joins the Snake River.

Basin and discharge

See also
 List of rivers in Idaho
 Losing stream
 Tributaries of the Columbia River

References

 "Idaho Atlas and Gazetteer". 5th ed. DeLorme, 2002.
 Big Lost River, The Columbia Gazetteer of North America.
 Little Lost River, The Columbia Gazetteer of North America.
 
 
 
 
 
 
 

Rivers of Idaho
Rivers of Butte County, Idaho
Rivers of Custer County, Idaho
Tributaries of the Snake River